La quietud (English translation: The Quietude) is a 2018 Argentinian drama film.

Principal photography started in Buenos Aires in December 2017. The film stars Martina Gusmán and Bérénice Bejo as sisters, along with Édgar Ramírez, Graciela Borges, and Joaquín Furriel. It was directed by Pablo Trapero, with Sony Pictures International Productions (SPIP) as a co-producer.

The film premiered at the 75th Venice International Film Festival.

Cast
 Martina Gusmán as Mía Montemayor
 Bérénice Bejo as Eugenia Montemayor
 Édgar Ramírez as Vincent
 Joaquín Furriel as Esteban
 Graciela Borges as Esmeralda Montemayor
 Noemí Sayago as Raquel
 Alejandro Viola as attorney
 Isidoro Tolkachir as Augusto Montemayor
 Carlos Rivkin as Nicanor

References

External links
 
 

2018 films
2010s Spanish-language films
Films shot in Buenos Aires
Films directed by Pablo Trapero
Argentine drama films
2018 drama films
2010s Argentine films